Events in the year 1993 in Portugal.

Incumbents 

President: Mário Soares
Prime Minister: Aníbal Cavaco Silva

Events

Popular culture
For events in television, see 1993 in Portuguese television.

Sport
 Establishment of the Campeonato Nacional de Futebol Feminino.

Notable births
 22 January - Alex Marques, footballer (died 2013)

Notable deaths

References

 
Years of the 20th century in Portugal